The Scottish surname MacEwen derives from the Old Gaelic Mac Eoghainn, meaning 'the son of Eoghann'. The name is found today in both Scotland and Northern Ireland. Because it was widely used before its spelling was standardised, the modern name has several common variations.

The earliest attested use is by a Malcolm MacEwen, who witnessed a charter in 1174. The surname occurs in a number of prominent families throughout Scottish history. Although author R. S. T. MacEwen claimed that all these  families, with variant spellings of the surname indicating possible differing origins, probably originated in Clan Ewen of Otter, the history is more complex.

The name has varied heraldic traditions, reflecting the various origins. The first MacEwen armiger was granted arms in 1743, and his achievement reflects his family's origins in Clan MacDougall. However a second grant of arms in the name made in 1793 to William MacEwan of Glenboig, displays Cameron symbolism in both its crest and its central charge.

If one looks at the geographic distribution of the variants MacEwan and MacEwen in the 1881 UK census, it becomes apparent that the MacEwen variant mainly occurred in the extreme northeast in Kirkwall, and at a lesser density in the adjacent Inverness shire. By contrast MacEwan occurred almost exclusively in the southwest in Paisley (around Argyll). There is no overlap of the distributions, with neither name appearing in the intervening Perth shire. Variants such as McEwan and McEwen are mainly in Perth and more southerly regions of Scotland, perhaps suggesting that these forms arose as people moved in more recent times.

There are three versions of MacEwen tartan, the first of which is listed in Vestiarium Scoticum as Farquharson.

As of 2019, there are several recognized lineages. One society of Clan MacEwen in Scotland has elected a Commander and has petitioned the Lord Lyon to have his arms and Chieftainship recognized; if successful, this would return this branch of the clan to full Clan society status after about 500 years as an armigerous clan.


Notable people

born after 1800
William McEwan (1827–1913), Scottish brewer and politician
Thomas (Tom) McEwan (1846–1914), Scottish artist
William Macewen, CB, FRS, (1848–1924), Scottish surgeon
Alexander Robertson MacEwen (1851–1916), Scottish writer, minister, professor and Moderator of the United Free Church of Scotland
John Blackwood McEwen (1868–1948), Scottish composer
Alexander MacEwen (1875–1941), leader of the Scottish Party and the Scottish National Party
Norman MacEwen CB, CMG, DSO, RAF (1881–1953), senior commander in the Royal Air Force during the first half of the 20th century
John "Cap" McEwan (1892–1970), American football coach of Army, Oregon and Holy Cross
Clifford McEwen (1896–1967), Canadian air marshal

born after 1900
John "Black Jack" McEwen (1900–1980), Prime Minister of Australia
Andy McEwan, Scottish footballer
Annie McEwen (1900–1967), wife of Australian Prime Minister John McEwen
Grant MacEwan (1902–2000), Canadian academic, politician, and author
Frank McEwen (1907–1994), English artist, teacher, and museum administrator
Sydney MacEwan (1908–1991), Scottish tenor
Billy McEwan (1914–1991), Scottish footballer
Robert C. McEwen (1920–1997), U.S. Representative from New York (1965–1981)
Robert MacEwen (1928–2013), Rugby Union international who represented Scotland from 1954 to 1958
Geraldine McEwan (1932–2015), British actress
Bruce McEwen (1938–2020), American neuroendocrinologist
Gwendolyn MacEwen (1941–1987), Canadian poet and novelist
Paul MacEwan (1943–2017), politician and MLA in Nova Scotia, Canada
Ian McEwan (born 1948), English novelist
Frank McEwan, Scottish footballer

born after 1950
Alfred McEwen, professor of planetary geology
Anne McEwen (politician) (born 1954), Australian Labor Party politician
Ann McEwen, West Indian cricketer
Bob McEwen or Robert D. "Bob" McEwen (born 1950), U.S. Representative from Ohio (1981–1993)
Rob McEwen (born 1950), businessman
Billy McEwan (born 1951), Scottish footballer and manager
Jamie McEwan (1952–2014), American slalom canoeist and writer
Kirsteen McEwan (born 1975), Scottish badminton player
Mark McEwen (born 1954), American media personality
Mark McEwan (born 1957), Canadian celebrity chef
Nicola McEwen, FRSE professor of territorial politics at the University of Edinburgh, Centre on Constitutional Change
Stan McEwan (born 1957), Scottish footballer
David McEwan (producer) (born 1972), Australian/British music producer and musician
Joe McEwing (born 1972), American baseball player
Robbie McEwen (born 1972), Australian-Belgian cyclist
Sparky McEwen (born 1968), American football player
Andrea McEwan (born 1978), Australian singer
David McEwan (footballer) (born 1982), Scottish footballer
Danielle McEwan (born 1991), American ten-pin bowler
Zack MacEwen (born 1996), Canadian ice hockey player

Places 
Castle MacEwen, Argyll, Scotland
MacEwan, Edmonton, a neighbourhood in Edmonton, Alberta, Canada
MacEwan Glen, a neighbourhood in Calgary, Alberta, Canada
McEwen, Oregon, an unincorporated community in the United States
McEwen, Tennessee, a city in the United States
Division of McEwen, an electoral district in the Australian House of Representatives in Victoria

Other 
MacEwan University, a university in Edmonton, Alberta, Canada
MacEwan station, a light rail station serving the university
McEwan Pratt a British locomotive manufacturer from 1905 to 1914
McEwan Pratt Petrol Railcar, type of railcar in New Zealand
Macewen's operation, operation for the cure of inguinal hernia, developed by Scottish surgeon Sir William Macewen (1864–1924)
Macewen's sign, sign used to help to diagnose hydrocephalus (accumulation of excess cerebrospinal fluid) and brain abscesses
McEwans, a beer produced by the Caledonian brewery

See also 
Clan Ewen of Otter
Clan MacEwen
Eógan (given name), Ewen, Euan, Owain
List of Scottish Gaelic surnames
McCune (surname)
McCunn
McKeown

References 

Anglicised Scottish Gaelic-language surnames
Patronymic surnames
Surnames from given names